Caroline Louise Flack (9 November 1979 – 15 February 2020) was an English television presenter and actress. In 2014, she won the twelfth series of BBC's Strictly Come Dancing. From 2015 until 2019, she presented ITV's Love Island.

Flack grew up in Norfolk and took an interest in dancing and theatre while at school. She began her professional career as an actress, starring in Bo' Selecta! (2002) and presented various ITV2 shows including I'm a Celebrity...Get Me Out of Here! NOW! (2009–2010) and The Xtra Factor (2011–2013). Her Strictly Come Dancing win (2014) was praised for achieving a record perfect score in the final. The following year she began presenting The X Factor (2015) – replacing the long-standing presenter Dermot O'Leary – and Love Island (2015–2019). She left Love Island in December 2019 after being arrested for assault allegations.

On 15 February 2020, aged 40, Flack was found dead at her home in North East London; in August, a coroner's inquest recorded a verdict of suicide.

Early life
Caroline Louise Flack was born at Chase Farm Hospital, Enfield, London on 9 November 1979, the youngest of the four children of Coca-Cola sales representative Ian Flack and his wife, Christine ( Callis). Flack and her twin sister, Jody, were born when their sister Elizabeth was 10 and their brother Paul was 8. Jody, the elder twin by six minutes, was originally supposed to be called Caroline, but her mother decided the name did not suit her. Shortly after her birth, her father was promoted to the company's management, and the family moved to Thetford, Norfolk. When Flack was seven, they moved again to nearby East Wretham. Flack attended Great Hockham Primary School and Wayland High School in Watton, Norfolk. She developed an interest in dancing and performed in village pantomimes while at school. As a pupil, she was given medical treatment for being underweight. Between 1996 and 1999 she studied dancing and musical theatre at the Bodywork Company in Cambridge.

Career
In 2002 Flack gained her break on television playing Michael Jackson's pet chimpanzee Bubbles on the sketch show Bo' Selecta!. She then presented the International Pepsi Chart Show, and Fash FC which followed footballer John Fashanu managing an amateur team. In 2005 she had a regular segment on the video games show When Games Attack. From 2006 to 2008 she co-presented the Saturday morning show TMi with Sam & Mark, which aired on BBC Two and the CBBC Channel. Subsequently, she hosted the CBBC show Escape from Scorpion Island together with Reggie Yates.

Flack hosted the CBBC coverage of Comic Relief Does Fame Academy in March 2007, commenting on the semi-finals of the Eurovision Song Contest 2008 with Paddy O'Connell. She also hosted Big Brother's Big Mouth during the 2008 series. The Daily Mirror journalist Rob Leigh commented that "her sharp delivery makes her the best presenter they’ve had on this series". She was also reported to be replacing Dermot O'Leary on Big Brother's Little Brother.

In 2008, Flack co-presented the reboot of Gladiators, staying for two series. In July 2009, she was a substitute presenter on the BBC's Sunday show Something for the Weekend, while Amanda Hamilton was on maternity leave. In the same year Flack began hosting the ITV2 reality show I'm a Celebrity... Get Me Out of Here NOW!. She also won BBC Three's Dancing on Wheels with disabled partner James O'Shea and the pair represented Great Britain in the 2009 Wheelchair Dancing European Championships in Tel Aviv, finishing 16th in their category.

On 16 February 2010, she presented backstage at the 2010 Brit Awards on ITV2. In November, she returned to host I'm a Celebrity, Get Me out of Here Now! on ITV2. She also modelled for the magazine Maxim in the same year.

In 2011 Flack was a team captain on the ITV2 game show Minute to Win It. That year she and Olly Murs presented the eighth series of The Xtra Factor, replacing Konnie Huq. Flack and Murs both returned for the ninth series. Flack returned for the tenth series in 2013, while Murs was replaced by Matt Richardson. Both left at the end of the series. Flack hosted the ITV2 show Viral Tap in 2014. In December 2014 she reunited with Murs to host a Christmas Day and New Year's Eve programme on British radio station Magic Radio.

Flack was announced as a contestant on the twelfth series of Strictly Come Dancing in 2014, partnered with Pasha Kovalev. The couple went on to win the series that December. They earned the first perfect 40 of the series for their salsa in the semi-finals, followed by an additional three in the finals giving them a perfect total of 120 points, a previously unmatched feat. Judge Bruno Tonioli described Flack's cha-cha-cha performance as a "golden sex goddess", while Darcey Bussell said their showdance reminded her of "watching a beautiful contemporary ballet". The win motivated Flack to do more theatre work, leading to her starring as Irene Roth in a touring version of the musical Crazy for You in 2017, and playing Roxie Hart in a production of Chicago at the Phoenix Theatre the following year.

In April 2015 it was announced that Flack, along with Murs would replace Dermot O'Leary as the hosts for the 12th series of The X Factor from August. The following February, Flack and Murs confirmed that they would not be returning for the 13th series of The X Factor and were replaced by a returning O'Leary.

Flack began presenting ITV2's Love Island in 2015. The programme had previously been shown on ITV a decade earlier but had not been particularly successful. With Flack as presenter, the show attracted 4 million viewers by 2018, becoming the most watched on the channel. She also presented the spin-off show Love Island: Aftersun when the third series was broadcast in 2017. She stood down from the role in December 2019 following allegations of common assault. She was nominated as best television presenter at the National Television Awards four times from 2017 to 2020 consecutively for her work on the show.

In December 2015, she was part of the presenting team for ITV's Christmas telethon Text Santa. In May 2016 she began co-presenting Sunday Morning Breakfast from 9am to noon over the summer with Gethin Jones across the Heart Network.

Flack had been due to present a reality series about cosmetic surgery called The Surjury on Channel 4, but it was cancelled following her death in February 2020. She has a cameo role in the film Greed, which was released on 21 February 2020. The trailer, which featured her role, premiered on the same day.

Personal life
Flack suffered from long-term mental health issues, attempting suicide and self-harming on various occasions as a young presenter and actress. She was known not to take well the criticism that came with fame, and TV producer Anna Blue said that "she just wasn't emotionally wired to deal with all the problems that came with being famous".

She dated Prince Harry in 2009, but the relationship ended quickly after the media began reporting on it, according to both of their autobiographies. In 2011, she had a brief relationship with One Direction member Harry Styles. Around 2014 and 2015, she was in a relationship with Sam Smith's manager Jack Street. She was briefly engaged to the reality TV personality Andrew Brady in 2018, and dated the rugby player Danny Cipriani in 2019.

On 13 December 2019, Flack was charged with assaulting her boyfriend, the tennis player Lewis Burton, after an incident reported by Burton at her Islington flat the previous morning. Police found Flack covered with blood when they arrived, and they reported that she admitted that she had struck Burton (saying "I did it, I whacked him round the head like that"), before warning them she would kill herself. Her inquest later found that Flack had hit and attacked Burton while he slept as she thought he was cheating, and that Burton had suffered a head wound. On 17 December, Flack stood down from hosting Love Island in order to "not detract attention from the upcoming series".

It was later reported that Flack was glad for the break from her hosting role as she was experiencing "personal issues" and had been suffering from an emotional breakdown for "a very long time". Despite this, the show's producers said that the "door was open" for a possible future return as host. Flack pleaded not guilty to the charges at Highbury Corner Magistrates' Court on 23 December 2019. Her solicitor told the court that Burton did not support the prosecution and that "he is not the victim, as he would say, he was a witness". She was released on bail with the condition that she not contact Burton and was due to stand trial on 4 March 2020. Burton posted an affectionate Valentine's Day message on his Instagram profile the day before she died. Flack's management criticised the Crown Prosecution Service (CPS) for continuing with what her management termed a "show trial", even after Burton decided not to support the prosecution. The CPS chief prosecutor responded that he was unaware of Flack's background and did not want to "do what you think is popular".

Death
On 15 February 2020, Flack was found dead in her flat, in Stoke Newington, London. She was 40 years old. The lawyer acting for her family stated that her death was a suicide by hanging. A private funeral took place in Greenacres Memorial Park at Colney near Norwich on 10 March.

The inquest into her death opened on 19 February, and was adjourned until 5 August. On 6 August, after a two-day hearing, the coroner found that Flack's death was a suicide.

Reactions
A scheduled Love Island highlights episode on ITV was cancelled and E4 pulled a Love Island USA sketch on Robot Chicken involving Bitch Pudding (a female character of the show) out of respect. The next episode of Love Island to air showed a tribute to Flack along with advertisements for the support charity Samaritans. Flack's is the fourth suicide linked to Love Island. Her death raised questions about the pressures of the programme and resulted in calls for it to be cancelled, with many pointing out that The Jeremy Kyle Show had recently been cancelled after a participant had died by suicide.

Following Flack's death, the British Labour Party MP Lisa Nandy blamed social media networks for failing to prevent harassment and bullying, saying: "In no other area of life would we allow private companies to police themselves. We ought to make sure the state has a system of regulation and support around that." Many other British politicians, including Keir Starmer, Grant Shapps, Daisy Cooper, Matt Hancock, Nadine Dorries and Kate Osamor, condemned the British press and social media; Cooper said: "In Britain we have trial by courts and not trial by media for a reason. Regardless of what took place she should not have been hounded to death by tabloid newspapers desperate for clickbait." Flack's friend Stephanie Davis set up a petition to establish new laws for "safeguarding celebrities and people in the public eye", which attracted over half a million signatures in a week. Following a review of Flack's charges by the CPS, it was found that the decision to go ahead with the trial was handled appropriately. On 13 February 2023, the Metropolitan Police apologised to Caroline’s mother, Christine, saying that while no misconduct was identified, records should have been kept per standard procedure and they would listen to recommendations from the Independent Office for Police Conduct. She later said she believed Caroline would still be alive had she not been charged with assault.

Legacy
In February 2021, on the anniversary of her death, a mural of Flack was painted by artist Scott Wilcock on a wall in Wigan as a tribute. It featured a quote by author Jennifer Dukes Lee that Flack had requoted, "In a world where you can be anything, be kind".

In June 2021, several of Flack's friends participated in a charity fundraising event that was dedicated to her memory. The event, called "Climb for Caroline", challenged participants to climb 24 peaks in the Lake District within a 24-hour period. Proceeds from the event were donated to the Samaritans. One of Flack's friends who participated, Olly Murs, noted afterwards that the event was a particularly appropriate remembrance of Flack because exercise was one of the strategies she had used to manage her mental health.

Filmography

Principal shows

Guest appearances
 Celebrity Juice (13 May 2010, 6 October 2011, 26 April 2012, 18 October 2012, 17 October 2013, 1 May 2014, 19 March 2015, 31 March 2016) – Panelist
 Never Mind the Buzzcocks (2 December 2011, 12 November 2012) – Panelist
 Loose Women (25 June 2012, 12 January 2015, 13 June 2017, 20 December 2018) – Guest
 Sweat the Small Stuff (30 April 2013) – Panelist
 Who Wants to Be a Millionaire? (22 June 2013) – Contestant
 Alan Carr: Chatty Man (3 October 2014, 29 May 2015) – Guest
 Alan Carr's New Year Specstacular (31 December 2014) – Guest

Radio

Bibliography

Flack published her autobiography Storm in a C-Cup in 2015. Following her death, it was reissued in 2020, with further information about her battles with anxiety.

It has been confirmed by Simon & Schuster that Flack had been working on another book before her death, which blended aspects of self-help with her personal recollections on maintaining good mental health.

See also
 List of Strictly Come Dancing contestants

References
Notes

Citations

Books

External links

1979 births
2020 deaths
Burials in Norfolk
2020 suicides
English television presenters
Female suicides
Fraternal twins
People from Enfield, London
People from Watton, Norfolk
People with bipolar disorder
Strictly Come Dancing winners
Television personalities from London
Television personalities from Norfolk
English twins
Suicides by hanging in England
Suicides in Greater London
Rugby union players' wives and girlfriends
Gladiators (1992 British TV series)